The PNR 8300 class, also referred to as INKA coaches, is a class of locomotive-hauled passenger coaches operated by the Philippine National Railways since 2021.

Purchase
The Philippine National Railways received a budget through the 2018 General Appropriations Act for the purchase of trains. On May 28, 2018, three INKA CC300 locomotives and fifteen passenger coaches were ordered together with four sets of four-car trains worth  (US$47.4 million).

Design
The trains were manufactured by the Indonesian firm Industri Kereta Api, also known as INKA. The design were based on the middle coaches of the PNR 8000 class and 8100 class DMUs retaining the same specifications. The 8300 class coaches, along with the 8000 and 8100 DMUs are all given the designation K3 while in Indonesia.

Car body
The coaches sport a livery of white as the body color, with black in its windows and orange stripes. The coaches also bear the Philippine National Railways and the Department of Transportation logos.

In total, there are five air-conditioning units in a five-car train set.

Interior

There are three double-leaf sliding doors per side and longitudinal seats are used. The interior design is the same as the middle cars of the 8000 and 8100 DMUs. The middle coach has a control room where the doors, lighting, and passenger announcements are controlled. Each car has closed-circuit television cameras installed.

Operations
The INKA CC300 locomotives and INKA 8300 coaches were delivered on December 23, 2020, and were unveiled on the same day. Passenger trial runs begun on January 15, 2021, for 150-hour RAMS validation tests, while the trains were officially inaugurated on January 28, 2021, at Dela Rosa station together with the Philippine National Railways and the Department of Transportation officials. The trains officially entered revenue service on the same day.

On July 13, 2021, the INKA CC300 and the 8300 coaches reached Laguna for the first time. It was performed by INKA CC300 set 9003 and 8300 class trainset 8302. Arthur Tugade and the DOTr officials were on board the said trainset for the inspection of the PNR Calamba section of the North–South Commuter Railway project.

On February 13, 2022, DHL 9003, INKA 8300 class set 8302, and an SVI shunter reached San Pablo Station. The said train will be used for the San Pablo - Lucena commuter service. The train however returned to Manila by February 15.

On April 7, 2022, An INKA CC300 and 8300 class coach was used as a sleep train to Calamba for the first time. It was performed by DHL 9003 and passenger set 8301.

On June 25, 2022, DHL 9001 and 9003 along with INKA 8300 class set 8302 and 8303 is used on the Inauguration of the Inter-Provincial Commuter line. DHL 9003 and 8302 went Home to Tutuban station to Serve the MSC line a day later.

Gallery

See also
 PNR Hyundai Rotem DMU
 203 series
 List of Philippine National Railways rolling stock
 PNR 8000 class
 PNR 8100 class
 INKA CC300

Notes

References

Philippine National Railways
Rolling stock of the Philippines
Train-related introductions in 2021